Nicolas Devilder and Édouard Roger-Vasselin won in the final 5-7, 6-2, [10-8], against Flavio Cipolla and Simone Vagnozzi.

Seeds

  Flavio Cipolla /  Simone Vagnozzi (final)
  Kevin Anderson /  Brian Battistone (second round)
  Marco Crugnola /  Uros Vico (first round)
  Grigor Dimitrov /  Alexandre Sidorenko (second round)

Draw

Draw

External links 
Main Draw

Internationaux de Nouvelle-Caledonie - Doubles
2010 - Doubles